Shepley is an unincorporated community at the border of the towns of Birnamwood and Almon, Wisconsin in Shawano County, Wisconsin, United States.

History
A post office called Shepley was established in 1907, and remained in operation until it was discontinued in 1935. The community was named for Colonel J. S. Shepley, a local landowner.

References

External links
Shepley in the Dictionary of Wisconsin History

Unincorporated communities in Shawano County, Wisconsin
Unincorporated communities in Wisconsin